James Douglas Ignatius Macdonald (born 1954) is an American author and critic who lives in New Hampshire. He frequently collaborated with his late wife Dr. Debra Doyle. He works in several genres, concentrating on fantasy, but also writing science fiction, and mystery and media tie-ins.

Biography
Macdonald was born in 1954, and raised in White Plains, New York. He attended the University of Rochester, and went on to serve in the US Navy for fifteen years. He has been writing professionally since the early 1990s and has published 35 novels.

Educational work
Macdonald is well known for his work in educating aspiring authors, particularly for his advice on avoiding literary scams.  Early in his career he was asked by such an author how much he had paid to have his books published, and in response began a campaign of educating other writers about the problems of vanity publishers.  As part of this campaign, he coined Yog's Law, which states "Money should flow toward the author." This rule is named after "Yog Sysop", a nickname of Macdonald that refers to Yog-Sothoth. It is often quoted by professional authors such as John Scalzi and Teresa Nielsen Hayden  when giving advice on finding an agent and getting published.

Atlanta Nights and PublishAmerica

One target of his campaign is PublishAmerica, a company that claims not to be a vanity publisher but a "traditional publisher" that accepts or rejects books based on their quality.  Macdonald organized a group of professional authors to test whether that company was actually reading any submissions for clarity and realism before accepting them.  One day after Macdonald issued a press release announcing that PublishAmerica had accepted a manuscript that was created to be as bad as possible, the company withdrew the offer to publish it.

Awards and honors
Knight's Wyrd was awarded the Mythopoeic Fantasy Award for Children's Literature, 1992, and named to the New York Public Library Books for the Teen Age list in 1993. In 1997, he was awarded Best Young-Adult Science Fiction by the Science Fiction Chronicle for Groogleman.

Select bibliography
This bibliography is based on Macdonald's entry on the Internet Speculative Fiction Database.

Novels
 The Apocalypse Door, Tor (New York, NY), 2002.

Novels with Debra Doyle 
 (Under pseudonym Robyn Tallis) Night of Ghosts and Lightning ("Planet Builders" series), Ivy, 1989. 
 (Under pseudonym Robyn Tallis) Zero-Sum Games ("Planet Builders" series), Ivy, 1989. 
 (Under pseudonym Nicholas Adams) Pep Rally ("Horror High"  series), HarperCollins, 1991  
 (Under pseudonym Victor Appleton) Monster Machine ("Tom Swift" series), Pocket Books (New York, NY), 1991. 
 (Under pseudonym Victor Appleton) Aquatech Warriors ("Tom Swift" series), Pocket Books (New York, NY), 1991. 
 Timecrime, Inc. ("Robert Silverberg's 'Time Tours'" series), Harper (New York, NY), 1991. 
 Night of the Living Rat ("Daniel Pinkwater's 'Melvinge of the Megaverse'" series), Ace Books (New York, NY), 1992. 
 Knight's Wyrd, Harcourt, Brace (New York, NY), 1992. 
 Groogleman, Harcourt, Brace (New York, NY), 1996. 
 Requiem for Boone (based on the television series Gene Roddenberry's Earth—Final Conflict), Tor (New York, NY), 2000. 
 (As Douglas Morgan) Tiger Cruise, Forge (New York, NY), 2000. 
 (As Douglas Morgan) What Do You Do with a Drunken Sailor? (nonfiction), Swordsmith, 2002. 
 Land of Mist and Snow, Eos, 2006. 
 Lincoln's Sword, HarperCollins, 2010

Circle of Magic series, with Debra Doyle 
 School of Wizardry, Troll (Metuchen, NJ), 1990. 
 Tournament and Tower/The Secret of the Tower, Troll (Metuchen, NJ), 1990. 
 City by the Sea/The Wizard's Statue, Troll (Metuchen, NJ), 1990. 
 The Prince's Players/Danger in the Palace, Troll (Metuchen, NJ), 1990. 
 The Prisoners of Bell Castle/The Wizard's Castle, Troll (Metuchen, NJ), 1990. 
 The High King's Daughter, Troll (Metuchen, NJ), 1990. 
 Mystery at the Wizardry School, Troll (Metuchen NJ), 2003. 
 Voice of the Ice, Cloverdale Press, 2003.

Mageworlds series 
Written with Debra Doyle, Mageworlds is a space opera novel series originally published in the 1990s and re-issued as e-books in 2012.

 The Price of the Stars, Tor Books (New York), 1992. 
 Starpilot's Grave, Tor, 1993. 
 By Honor Betray'd, Tor, 1994. 
 The Gathering Flame, Tor, 1995. 
 The Long Hunt, Tor, 1996. 
 The Stars Asunder, Tor, 1999. 
 A Working of Stars, Tor, 2002.

Bad Blood series, with Debra Doyle 

 Bad Blood, Berkley (New York, NY), 1993. 
 Hunters' Moon, Berkley (New York, NY), 1994. 
 Judgment Night, Berkley (New York, NY), 1995.

Under joint pseudonym "Martin Delrio", with Debra Doyle 

 Mortal Kombat (movie novelization), Tor (New York, NY), 1995. 
 Midnight Justice (Spider-Man Super-Thriller series), Byron Preiss (New York, NY), 1996. 
 Global War (Spider-Man Super-Thriller series), Byron Preiss (New York, NY), 1996. 
 Harold R. Foster's Prince Valiant (movie novelization), Avon (New York, NY), 1998. 
 The Loch Ness Monster (nonfiction), Rosen Publishing (New York, NY), 2002. 
 A Silence in the Heavens (novel; MechWarrior: Dark Age series), Roc (New York, NY), 2003. 
 Truth and Shadows (novel; MechWarrior: Dark Age series), Roc (New York, NY), 2003. 
 Service for the Dead (novel; MechWarrior: Dark Age series), Roc (New York, NY), 2003.

Short Stories 
 Rosemary: Scrambled Eggs on a Blue Plate, Tor, 1992 (co-written with Alan Rodgers and collected in Mike Resnick's alternate history anthology Alternate Kennedys)
 Now And in the Hour of Death, Tor, 1992 (co-written with Debra Doyle and also collected in Mike Resnick's alternate history anthology Alternate Kennedys)
 Souvenirs, Tor, 1992 (co-written with Alan Rodgers and collected in Mike Resnick's alternate history anthology Alternate Outlaws)

References

External links 

 
 
  (search pseudonyms too)
 Travis Tea - collective author of Atlanta Nights
 Interview on IT Conversations

20th-century American novelists
21st-century American novelists
American children's writers
American fantasy writers
American male novelists
American science fiction writers
Living people
People from White Plains, New York
Novelists from New York (state)
1954 births
20th-century American male writers
21st-century American male writers